Ryan Walker (born 12 July 1986) is a rugby league footballer who formerly played for the Penrith Panthers in the NRL. His position of choice is five eighth. He played his junior rugby league for the Maclean Magpies and Casino Cougars.

Personal life
Ryan is the older brother of South Sydney Rabbitohs player Cody Walker and cousin of former Gold Coast Titans player Shannon Walker.

References

External links
Penrith Panthers profile
NRL profile

1986 births
Living people
Penrith Panthers players
Australian rugby league players
Indigenous Australian rugby league players
Rugby league wingers
Windsor Wolves players
Rugby league centres
Sunshine Coast Sea Eagles players
Place of birth missing (living people)